Magnolia delavayi is a species of flowering plant in the genus Magnolia. It is known by the common names of Chinese evergreen magnolia or Delavay's magnolia. It was named after Father Delavay, French Catholic missionary in China, who collected it.

Description
[[File:Magnolia delavayi flower.jpg|thumbnail|left|Magnolia delavayi'''s flower]]Magnolia delavayi is a small evergreen tree  in height with gray to grayish-black bark. The leaves are ovate to ovate-oblong, 10–20 cm (rarely to 32 cm) long and 5–10 cm (rarely to 20 cm) broad, tough, leathery, with a 5–7 cm petiole.

The flowers are fragrant, cup-shaped, 15–25 cm broad, with nine thick, creamy white to pink tepals; stamens ca. 210 and ovoid gynoecium with ca. 100 carpels.

Distribution and habitatMagnolia delavayi is native to southern China, occurring in Guizhou, Sichuan and Yunnan at 1,500-2,800 m of elevation.

Ecology
In its native habitat, flowering occurs from April to June. It grows on wet slopes on limestone areas.

CultivationMagnolia delavayi is grown as an ornamental tree for its evergreen foliage as well as flowers. It is uncommon though increasing in cultivation elsewhere, such as in California. A recently selected red-flowered form is becoming popular in cultivation.Magnolia delavayi is the city tree of Chongqing.

References

Further reading
Hunt, D. (ed). (1998). Magnolias and their allies''. International Dendrology Society and Magnolia Society. 
Rivers, M.C. & Wheeler, L. 2014. Magnolia delavayi. The IUCN Red List of Threatened Species 2014. Downloaded on 8 October 2015.

External links
 Photos of flowers and foliage

delavayi
Endemic flora of China
Flora of Guizhou
Flora of Sichuan
Flora of Yunnan
Trees of China
Garden plants of Asia
Ornamental trees